Overamstel is an Amsterdam Metro station in the industrial area Overamstel of Amsterdam, Netherlands.

The Station

The station opened in 1990 and is served by 2 lines, the 50 (Isolatorweg - Gein) and the 51 (Isolatorweg - Amsterdam Centraal).

The metro station is only accessible with an OV-chipkaart or GVB Travel Pass.

Change at this station between lines 50 and 51.

References

External links
GVB website 

Amsterdam Metro stations
Railway stations opened in 1990